The 1985–86 Ranji Trophy was the 52nd season of the Ranji Trophy. Delhi defeated Haryana by an innings and 141 runs in the final.

Expansion
Three teams participated for the first time: Goa in the South Zone, Himachal Pradesh in the North Zone and Tripura in the East Zone. This raised the number of teams from 24 to 27.

Highlights
Playing for Rajasthan against Vidarbha, Pradeep Sunderam took all 10 wickets for 78 runs, and 16 wickets for 154 runs. This was the second (and till 2021, the last) instance of a bowler taking 10 wickets in an innings in Ranji trophy.

Group stage

North Zone

Central Zone

West Zone

South Zone

East Zone

Knockout stage 

(T) - Advanced to next round by spin of coin.

Final

Scorecards and averages
Cricketarchive

References

External links

1986 in Indian cricket
Domestic cricket competitions in 1985–86
Ranji Trophy seasons